Lê Hoàn (10 August 941 – 18 March 1005), posthumously title Lê Đại Hành, was a Vietnamese emperor and the third ruler of Dai Viet kingdom, ruling from 981 to 1005. He first served as the generalissimo commanding a ten-thousand man army of the Dai Viet court under the reign of Đinh Bộ Lĩnh. Following the death of Đinh Bộ Lĩnh in late 979, Lê Hoàn became regent to Đinh Bộ Lĩnh's successor, the six-year-old Đinh Toàn. Lê Hoàn deposed the boy king, married his mother, Queen Duong Van Nga, and in 980 he became the ruler. He commanded the Viet army fended off a northern invasion in 981, then led a seaborne invasion of the southern Champa kingdom in 982.

Early career
Lê Hoàn was born in 941, a native of Ai Province (Thanh Hoa). He rose to power as a general of the Hoa Lu warlord Đinh Bộ Lĩnh. In 968, after defeating all other warlords, Đinh Bộ Lĩnh founded the Dai Viet kingdom with Hoa Lu as capital. Lê Hoàn was appointed the title "General of Ten Circuits" and commander of the kingdom's military.

Rise to the throne

In late 979 Đinh Bộ Lĩnh and his son Dinh Lien were slain by an official named Do Thich while sleeping in the courtyard. Following the deaths of the king and the prince, notable members of the court Nguyen Bac and Le Hoan enthroned the six-year-old prince Đinh Toàn as king. However Queen Duong wanted Le Hoan to become the ruler as it would be better for the kingdom. Đinh Toàn gave up the crown while Le Hoan took power with the reign name Thien Phuc, thus transferring power from the Đinh clan to the Le clan.

Reign

Foreign relations with Song China and Champa

Disturbances in Dai Viet had attracted attention from the Chinese Song Empire in the north. The emperor Taizong ordered Hou Renbao advance into Dai Viet territories, although Le Hoan had sent a message to the Song court which was declined. In early 981 the Chinese navy under Liu Cheng defeated Le Hoan's military on the Bạch Đằng River, killing 1,000 Viet sailors and seizing 200 junks. Hou Renbao urged his troops to march forward, but they didn't until Liu Cheng finally arrived and the Song land forces and navy regrouped at Da La village, then returned to Hoa Bo (Chi Lăng). Le Hoan pretended to surrender, tricked Hou Renbao to come, and then killed him and massacred his troops. The Song army was forced to retreat and their generals were punished with summary execution in Kaifeng for military failures. The Sung then sent three envoys in 986, 998, and 990 to Dai Viet, normalizing the relations between the two countries.

The king of Champa, Paramesvaravarman I, previously had attacked Dai Viet in late 979 in the name of restoring Ngô Nhật Khánh, a Vietnamese dissent, but was stopped by a typhoon. In the next year Le Hoan sent an embassy to Champa, however was detained by the Cham king. The Viet king then led an army stormed south, killed Paramesvaravarman in battle and sacked Indrapura. Paramesvaravarman's Prince Jaya Indravarman IV sought refuge in the south. In the next year, Lưu Kế Tông, a Vietnamese officer in the Cham army, had seized power in Champa and successfully resisted Le Hoan's attempt to remove him from power.

In early 995, 100 Viet warships sailed onto Yongzhou (Nanning, Guangxi), sacked the town of Ruhong before leaving. In summer, Le Hoan's local officials from To Mau (modern-day Quang Ninh) led a village force of 5,000 men and sailors who invaded China, plundered Luzhou near Yongzhou, but were defeated by Chinese general Yang Wenjie. In 1004, Le Hoan sent a mission to China led by one of his sons, Prince Lê Minh Đề. Minh Đề was invited for the 1005 Lunar New Year Festival's feast of the Song court along with emissaries of Champa and Arab. The Song records treated Dai Viet along with Java, Pagan, and the Arabs as equal sovereign states. Outside China and Champa, a Khmer inscription dated 987 records the arrival of Vietnamese merchants in Angkor.

Kingship

In the court, Le Hoan maintained the Buddhist patriarch Khuông Việt as the great preceptor, while appointing a Chinese named Hongjian as the position of classic and history expert of the court. He established five queens as minor wives while Queen Duong remained as his first lady. He appointed his family members including his brother and his sons to rule other parts of the kingdom. In 987, five years after a drought in 982, Le Hoan held a Royal Ploughing Ceremony on two rice fields and put a pot of gold in each. In 995 he built the Mahayana Nhat Tru temple in Hoa Lu and left inscriptions on it, cited verses from the Śūraṅgama Sūtra.

Death
In 1005 he died at age 64 while a civil war for succession erupted between his sons. He was called Đại Hành Hoàng đế (大行皇帝; literally "the Departed Emperor") after his death and later became his posthumously title. His twenty-years old fifth son Le Long Dinh seized the throne in later that year after murdering his older brother Lê Long Việt who only held the crown in 3 days, and ruled the country for the next four years.

Family
 Parents
 Lê Mịch (黎覔)
 Đặng Thị Sen (鄧氏𬞮)
 Wives
 Lady Dương Vân Nga (楊雲娥, 942 – 1000) 
 Phụng Càn Chí Lý Hoàng hậu (奉乾至理皇后)
 Thuận Thánh Minh Đạo Hoàng hậu (順聖明道皇后)
 Lady Trịnh Quắc (鄭國皇后)
 Lady Phạm (范皇后)
 Children
 Lê Long Thâu (黎龍鍮, ? – 1000), first son
 Lê Long Tích (黎龍錫; ? – 1005), second son
 Lê Long Việt (黎龍鉞, 983 – 1005), successor, reigned 3 days (the shortest reign of Vietnamese monarchs), third son
 Lê Long Đinh (黎龍釘, 986 – ?), fourth son
 Lê Long Đĩnh (黎龍鋌, 986 – 1009), the third monarch of the family), fifth son
 Lê Long Cân (黎龍釿), sixth son
 Lê Long Tung (黎龍鏦), seventh son
 Lê Long Tương (黎龍鏘), eighth son
 Lê Long Kính (黎龍鏡, ? – 1005), ninth son
 Lê Long Mang (黎龍鋩), tenth son
 Lê Minh Đề(黎明提), eleventh son
 Dương Hy Liễn, adopted daughter
 Lê Thị Phất Ngân (黎氏佛銀, 981 - ?), wife of Lý Công Uẩn

Ancestry

References

Work cited

 
 
 
 
 
 

941 births
1005 deaths
Early Lê dynasty emperors
Đinh dynasty generals
Đinh dynasty officials
Vietnamese monarchs
Founding monarchs